Pattimura Stadium is a multi-use stadium in Ambon, Indonesia. It is currently used mostly for football matches. The stadium is one of the biggest in eastern Indonesia. The stadium holds 25,000 people.

References 

Ambon, Maluku
Football venues in Indonesia
Buildings and structures in Maluku (province)